Hößler is a German surname.  Notable people with the surname include:

Elias Hößler (1663–1746), German pipe organ builder
Franz Hößler (1906–1945), German SS officer at several Nazi concentration camps executed for war crimes

See also
Hosler

German-language surnames